Joël Robuchon is a French gourmet restaurant opened by French chef and restaurateur Joël Robuchon. The restaurant, located at the MGM Grand Las Vegas in Las Vegas, Nevada, was rated 3 stars in 2009 by the Michelin Guide,  5-stars by  Forbes Travel Guide, and has been ranked by Wine Spectator and Travel and Leisure to be among the finest restaurants in the world. It was ranked as one of the Top 5 best restaurants in the United States by Gourmet magazine in 2011.

Cuisine
The French cuisine is offered either as a prix fixe or an a la carte menu.  There are 12 tables in the main dining room.

Awards and accolades
5 Stars, 2019 Forbes Travel Guide
5 Diamonds, 2006-2022 AAA Restaurant Ratings
3 Stars, 2008 and 2009 Michelin Guide
2006, Top 5 Best Restaurants in the United States, Gourmet magazine
2007, Travel and Leisure "Best New Restaurant in the World"
2007, French Restaurant, Best Chef in Las Vegas, Life Epicurean Awards
2009, Wine Spectator "Grand Award"
2009,  The Laurent Perrier 2009 Lifetime Achievement Award at The S.Pellegrino World's 50 Best Restaurants

See also
 List of Michelin three-starred restaurants
 List of restaurants in the Las Vegas Valley
 List of Michelin 3-star restaurants in the United States

Notes

References

External links

 
 Robuchon Las Vegas dininginfrance.com

Restaurants in the Las Vegas Valley
French restaurants in Nevada
Restaurants established in 2006
MGM Grand Las Vegas
2006 establishments in the United States